The Reverend Turns a Blind Eye is a 1971 West German comedy film directed by Harald Vock and starring Roy Black, Uschi Glas and Georg Thomalla. It was followed by a 1972 sequel Always Trouble with the Reverend.

It was partly shot on location around Lake Wörthersee in the Austrian state of Carinthia.

Synopsis
A well-meaning priest gets himself into a number of scrapes.

Cast

References

Bibliography 
 Hans-Michael Bock and Tim Bergfelder. The Concise Cinegraph: An Encyclopedia of German Cinema. Berghahn Books, 2009.

External links 
 

1971 films
1971 comedy films
German comedy films
West German films
1970s German-language films
Films directed by Harald Vock
Films scored by Gerhard Heinz
Gloria Film films
Films about Catholic priests
1970s German films